Kertasari is a district (Kecamatan) in the Bandung Regency, Indonesia.

Administrative divisions 
Kertasari is divided into 8 villages, which are 
 
 Cibeureum 
 Cihawuk
 Cikembang
 Neglawangi
 Resmitinggal
 Santosa
 Sukapura
 Tarumajaya

References

Bandung Regency